Lukowich is a surname. Notable people with the surname include:

Bernie Lukowich (born 1952), Canadian retired hockey player, father of Brad Lukowich
Brad Lukowich (born 1976), Canadian hockey player
Ed Lukowich, Canadian champion curler
Morris Lukowich (born 1956), Canadian retired hockey player, brother of Ed and cousin of Brad